The John K. MacIver Institute for Public Policy is a Wisconsin-based conservative think tank. According to the organization, the MacIver Institute promotes free markets, individual freedom, personal responsibility, and limited government. It is a member of the State Policy Network.

Personnel and funding
The president of the MacIver Institute is Brett Healy.

One of the MacIver Institute's primary donors is the Bradley Foundation. As of November 2014, the Bradley Foundation had given the MacIver Institute $890,000 since the MacIver Institute's 2008 launch.

Activities
In 2011, the MacIver Institute and Americans for Prosperity purchased more than $500,000 worth of television ads in Wisconsin supporting Scott Walker's budget proposals.

In 2014, a Wisconsin appeals court sided with the MacIver Institute, ruling that Democratic State Senator Jon Erpenbach must turn over 2,600 emails sent to him during the political battle over Scott Walker's 2011 Wisconsin Act 10.

References

External links

 Official website
 Organizational Profile – National Center for Charitable Statistics (Urban Institute)
 Don Walker Groups seek emails of Democratic lawmakers, Milwaukee Journal Sentinel, March 31, 2011

2008 establishments in Wisconsin
Organizations based in Madison, Wisconsin
Think tanks established in 2008
Think tanks based in the United States
501(c)(3) organizations
Conservative organizations in the United States